This list of military decorations is an index to articles about notable military decorations. It is organized by country in alphabetical order and in order of precedence.
Note that there are many pages which overlap the domain of this page, including military awards and decorations and campaign medal, and pages mentioned within :category:Military awards and decorations, :category:Battle honours, :category:Orders, decorations, and medals and other categories.

By country

Afghanistan
Orders, decorations, and medals of Afghanistan

Albania
Civil awards and decorations of Albania

Algeria
Honorary Spahi
National Order of Merit

Ancient Rome
Military awards and decorations of ancient Rome

Andorra
Orders, decorations, and medals of Andorra

Antigua and Barbuda
Orders, decorations, and medals of Antigua and Barbuda

Argentina
Orders, decorations, and medals of Argentina

Armenia
Awards and decorations of Armenia

Australia
Australian honours system

Austria

Austria (Republic)
Orders, decorations, and medals of Austria

Austria-Hungary (Monarchy)
Military awards and decorations of Austria-Hungary

Azerbaijan
Orders, decorations, and medals of Azerbaijan

Baden
Orders, decorations, and medals of Baden

Bahamas
Orders, decorations, and medals of the Bahamas

Bahrain
Orders, decorations, and medals of Bahrain

Bangladesh
 Orders, decorations, and medals of Bangladesh
 Medals of the Bangladesh Armed Forces

Barbados
Orders, decorations, and medals of Barbados

Belarus
Orders, decorations, and medals of Belarus

Belgium
 Orders, decorations, and medals of Belgium
 Belgian order of precedence (decorations and medals)

Belize
Orders, decorations, and medals of Belize

Benin
Orders, decorations, and medals of Benin

Bhutan
:Category:Orders, decorations, and medals of Bhutan

Bolivia
Orders, decorations, and medals of Bolivia

Bosnia and Herzegovina
Orders, decorations, and medals of Bosnia and Herzegovina

Botswana
Orders, decorations and medals of Botswana

Brazil
Orders, decorations, and medals of Brazil

British Empire
Orders, decorations, and medals of the British Empire

Brunei
Orders, decorations, and medals of Brunei

Bulgaria
Orders, decorations, and medals of Bulgaria

Burma
Orders, decorations, and medals of Burma

Cambodia
Orders, decorations, and medals of Cambodia

Cameroon
Orders, decorations, and medals of Cameroon

Canada
Orders, decorations, and medals of Canada
Orders, decorations, and medals of the Canadian provinces

Chile
Orders, decorations, and medals of Chile

China
Orders, decorations, and medals of China

Colombia

:Category:Orders, decorations, and medals of Colombia

Comoros
:Category:Orders, decorations, and medals of the Comoros

Confederate States
Davis Guards Medal

(Democratic Republic of the) Congo
:Category:Orders, decorations, and medals of the Democratic Republic of the Congo

Croatia
Orders, decorations, and medals of Croatia
Orders, decorations, and medals of the Independent State of Croatia

Cuba
:Category:Orders, decorations, and medals of Cuba

Cyprus
Order of Makarios III

Czech Republic
State decorations of the Czech Republic

Czechoslovakia
:Category:Orders, decorations, and medals of Czechoslovakia
:Category:Military awards and decorations of Czechoslovakia
Order of the Falcon (Czechoslovakia)
Order of the White Lion
Military Cross (Czechoslovakia)
Legion of Merit (Czechoslovakia)
Czechoslovak War Cross
Czechoslovak War Cross 1918
Czechoslovak War Cross 1939–1945
Medal of Merit (Czechoslovakia)

Denmark
Orders, decorations, and medals of Denmark

Dominica
:Category:Orders, decorations, and medals of Dominica

Dominican Republic
Orders, decorations, and medals of the Dominican Republic

East Timor
Orders, decorations, and medals of East Timor

Ecuador
:Category:Orders, decorations, and medals of Ecuador

Egypt
:Category:Orders, decorations, and medals of Egypt 
Order of the Nile
Order of Ismail
Order of Ramesseses The Great
Order of Nasser
Medal of Narmer
Medal of The Golden Eagle
Order of the Bronze Eagle

El Salvador
:Category:Orders, decorations, and medals of El Salvador

Estonia
Orders, decorations, and medals of Estonia

Ethiopia
:Category:Orders, decorations, and medals of Ethiopia
Order of Menelik II

Fiji
Fijian honours system

Finland
Orders, decorations, and medals of Finland 
List of honours of Finland awarded to heads of state and royalty

France
Orders, decorations, and medals of France
Historical orders, decorations, and medals of France
French overseas orders

Gabon
National Order of Merit
Order of the Equatorial Star

Georgia (country)
Orders, decorations, and medals of Georgia

Germany
Orders, decorations, and medals of Germany

Germany (Federal Republic)

German Democratic Republic (East Germany)

Germany (Third Reich)

Germany (Empire)

Ghana
Orders, decorations, and medals of Ghana

Greece
Orders, decorations, and medals of Greece

Greenland
:Category:Orders, decorations, and medals of Greenland

Guatemala
:Category:Orders, decorations, and medals of Guatemala

Guinea
National Order of Merit

Equatorial Guinea
:Category:Orders, decorations, and medals of Equatorial Guinea

Guyana
Orders, decorations, and medals of Guyana

Haiti
:Category:Orders, decorations, and medals of Haiti

Hanover
:Category:Orders, decorations, and medals of Hanover

Holy See

Hong Kong
Orders, decorations, and medals of Hong Kong

Hungary
Orders, decorations, and medals of Hungary 
1848–1849-es szabadságharc érdemjel (Military award of Hungarian Revolution of 1848)
vitéz plaqueKnightly Order of Bravery|Vitèzi Rend (Order of Vitéz) 
Magyar Szent Korona Rend (Order of the Hungarian Holy Crown)
Magyar Vitézségi Érem (Medal for Bravery)
 Magyar Érdemrend és Érdemérem (Order of Merit, Military Class)
 Délvidéki Emlékérem (Commemorative Medal for the Return of South Hungary)
 Erdélyi Emlékérem (Commemorative Medal for the Liberation of North Transylvania)
 Felvidéki Emlékérem (Commemorative Medal for the Liberation of Upper Hungary)
 Tűzkereszt (Fire Cross)

Iceland
:Category:Orders, decorations, and medals of Iceland

India

Wartime awards
Param Vir Chakra
Maha Vir Chakra
Vir Chakra
Peacetime awards
Ashoka Chakra
Kirti Chakra
Shaurya Chakra
Distinguished Service and Gallantry
Sena Medal (Army) Nao Sena Medal (Navy) Vayusena Medal (Air Force)
Sarvottam Yudh Seva Medal
Uttam Yudh Seva Medal
Yudh Seva Medal
Param Vishisht Seva Medal
Ati Vishisht Seva Medal
Vishisht Seva Medal

Indonesia
Orders, decorations, and medals of Indonesia

Iran
:Category:Orders, decorations, and medals of Iran
Awards and decorations of the Islamic Republic of Iran Armed Forces

Iraq
:Category:Orders, decorations, and medals of Iraq 
 Order of the Date Palm
Order of the Two Rivers

Ireland
Military awards and decorations of Ireland

Israel
:Category:Orders, decorations, and medals of Israel 
:Category:Military awards and decorations of Israel

Italy
 Orders, decorations, and medals of Italy

Ivory Coast
:Category:Orders, decorations, and medals of Ivory Coast

Jamaica

Japan

Jordan

Kazakhstan
Orders, decorations, and medals of Kazakhstan

Kenya
Orders, decorations, and medals of Kenya

Kiribati
Orders, decorations, and medals of Kiribati

Korea

North Korea
Orders and medals of North Korea

South Korea
Orders, decorations, and medals of South Korea

Kosovo
Orders, decorations, and medals of Kosovo

Kuwait
:Category:Orders, decorations, and medals of Kuwait
 Wisam al-Tahir (or Kuwait Liberation Medal)

Kyrgyzstan
Orders, decorations, and medals of Kyrgyzstan

Latvia

Lebanon
Orders, decorations, and medals of Lebanon

Liberia
:Category:Orders, decorations, and medals of Liberia

Libya
:Category:Orders, decorations, and medals of Libya

Liechtenstein
Orders, decorations, and medals of Liechtenstein

Lithuania
Orders, decorations, and medals of Lithuania

Luxembourg (Monarchy)
Orders, decorations, and medals of Luxembourg

Macau
Orders, decorations, and medals of Macau

Madagascar
:Category:Orders, decorations, and medals of Madagascar

Malawi
:Category:Orders, decorations, and medals of Malawi

(Federation of) Malaya
Johan Mangku Negara
Panglima Mangku Negara

Malaysia
Orders, decorations, and medals of Malaysia

Mali
:Category:Orders, decorations, and medals of Mali

Malta
Orders, decorations, and medals of Malta 
Sovereign Military Order of Malta
Order pro merito Melitensi

Mauritius
:Category:Orders, decorations, and medals of Mauritius

Mexico
Orders, decorations, and medals of Mexico
Mexican Imperial Orders 
Military decorations of Mexico

Moldova
Orders, decorations, and medals of Moldova

Monaco
Orders, decorations, and medals of Monaco

Mongolia
:Category:Orders, decorations, and medals of Mongolia

Montenegro
Orders, decorations, and medals of Montenegro

Morocco
:Category:Orders, decorations, and medals of Morocco
Order of Ouissam Alaouite
Order of the Military (Morocco)
Sharifian Order of Military Merit
Order of Military Merit (Morocco)

Mozambique
Orders, decorations, and medals of Mozambique

Myanmar
Orders, decorations, and medals of Myanmar

Namibia
Orders, decorations, and medals of Namibia
Decorations
 Namibian Cross for Bravery in Gold
 Order of Mukorob
 Namibian Cross for Bravery in Silver
 Namibian Cross for Bravery in Bronze
Campaign Medal(s)
 Campaign Medal
Long Service Medals
 Service Medal:  30 Years
 Service Medal:  20 Years
 Service Medal:  10 Years
Shooting Medal(s)
 Namibian Champion Shot Medal

Nepal
:Category:Orders, decorations, and medals of Nepal

Netherlands
:Category:Orders, decorations, and medals of the Netherlands 
:Category:Military awards and decorations of the Netherlands

Knightly military Orders
Military Order of William
Order of Orange-Nassau (Military division)
Decorations
Cross for Courage and Fidelity (Not awarded anymore)
Honorary Sabre (Not currently awarded)
Honorable Mention (Obsolete)
Bronze Lion
Bronze Cross
Cross of Merit
Airman's Cross
Decoration of Merit
Decoration for Important Military Acts (Not currently awarded)
Lombok Cross (Not awarded anymore)
War Remembrance Cross (Not awarded anymore)
Decoration for Order and Peace (Not awarded anymore)
New Guinea Remembrance Cross (Not awarded anymore)
Mobilisation War Cross (Not awarded anymore)
Cross for Justice and Freedom
Remembrance Medal UN Peace Operations (Not awarded anymore)
Remembrance Medal Multinational Operations (Not awarded anymore)
Remembrance Medal Peace Operations
Kosovo Medal
Decoration for Long-term Service as an Officer
Decoration for Long-term and Loyal Service at the Military Coastguard
Decoration Master-Marksman
Skills Medal KNIL (of the Royal Dutch East Indies Army - Not awarded anymore)
Shooting Price Star (of the Royal Dutch East Indies Army - Not awarded anymore)
Army Medal
Cross for the Four Day Marches

New Zealand
New Zealand royal honours system

Nigeria
Orders, decorations, and medals of Nigeria

North Macedonia
Orders, decorations, and medals of North Macedonia

Norway
Orders, decorations, and medals of Norway

Oman
Orders, decorations, and medals of Oman

Ottoman Empire
:Category:Orders, decorations, and medals of the Ottoman Empire

Palestine
Decorations, medals and badges of Palestine
Orders, decorations, and medals of the State of Palestine

Pakistan
Awards and decorations of the Pakistan Armed Forces
Civil decorations of Pakistan

Panama
:Category:Orders, decorations, and medals of Panama

Papua New Guinea
Papua New Guinea honours system

Peru
:Category:Orders, decorations, and medals of Peru

Philippines
Awards and decorations of the Armed Forces of the Philippines

Poland
Orders, decorations, and medals of Poland

Portugal
Orders, decorations, and medals of Portugal

Puerto Rico

Qatar
:Category:Orders, decorations and medals of Qatar

Rhodesia
Orders, decorations, and medals of Rhodesia 

Military decorations and medals awarded during the UDI (Unilateral Declaration of Independence) period from 1965 to 1979.  See also Zimbabwe.
Decorations
Grand Cross of Valour (GCV) (1970–1981)
 Order of the Legion of Merit:  Military Division  (1970–1981)
 Silver Cross of Rhodesia (SCR) (1970–1981)
 Bronze Cross of Rhodesia (BCR) (1970–1981)
 Defence Cross for Distinguished Service (DCD) (1976–1981)
 Meritorious Conduct Medal (MCM) (1970–1981)
 Medal for Meritorious Service (MSM) (1973–1981)
 Defence Forces' Medal for Meritorious Service (DMM) (1971–1981)
Campaign Medals
 Rhodesia General Service Medal  (1969)
Long Service Medals
 Exemplary Service Medal  (1970–1981)
 Medal for Territorial and Reserve Service  (1970–1981)
Shooting Medals
 President's Medal for Shooting (1970–1981)
Other Awards
 Military Forces Commendation (emblem) (1970–1981)

Romania
Orders, decorations, and medals of Romania

Russian Federation
Orders, decorations, and medals of Russia 

Honorary titles
Hero of the Russian Federation
Orders
Order of St. Andrew (highest civil and military award)
Order of Saint George (highest military award)
Order of Merit for the Motherland
Order of Courage
Order of Zhukov
Order of Suvorov
Order of Ushakov
Order of Kutuzov
Order of Alexander Nevsky
Order of Nakhimov
Order of Naval Merit
Order of Military Merit
Medals
 Medal of the Gold Star (for the title "Hero of the Russian Federation")
 Medal of the Order of Merit for the Motherland
Medal "For Courage"
Medal of Suvorov
Medal of Nesterov
Medal of Ushakov
Medal of Zhukov
Medal "For Distinction in the Protection of the State Borders"
Medal "For Distinction in the Protection of Public Order"

Rwanda
Orders, decorations, and medals of Rwanda

Saint Lucia
:Category:Orders, decorations, and medals of Saint Lucia

Samoa
Orders, decorations, and medals of Samoa

San Marino
:Category:Orders, decorations, and medals of San Marino

Saudi Arabia
:Category:Orders, decorations, and medals of Saudi Arabia 
Nuth al-Tahrir al-Kuwait (or Medal for the Liberation of Kuwait)

Senegal
Orders, decorations, and medals of Senegal

Serbia
Orders, decorations, and medals of Serbia

Sierra Leone
:Category:Orders, decorations, and medals of Sierra Leone

Singapore
:Category:Orders, decorations, and medals of Singapore 
:Category:Military awards and decorations of Singapore

Slovakia
Orders, decorations, and medals of Slovakia

Slovenia
Orders, decorations, and medals of Slovenia

Solomon Islands
:Category:Orders, decorations, and medals of the Solomon Islands

Somalia 

 Category:Military awards and decorations of Somalia

South Africa
Orders, decorations, and medals of South Africa
South African military decorations order of wear
South African military decorations

Soviet Union
Orders, decorations, and medals of the Soviet Union

Spain
Orders, decorations, and medals of Spain

Kingdom of Spain
Laureate Cross of Saint Ferdinand 
Medalla Militar (Military Medal)
Cruz de Guerra (War Cross)
Medalla del Ejército (Army Medal)
Medalla Naval (Navy Medal)
Medalla Aérea (Air Force Medal)
Orden del Mérito Militar (Order of Military Merit)
Orden del Mérito Naval (Order of Naval Merit)
Orden del Mérito Policial (Order of Policial Merit)
Orden del Mérito Aeronáutico (Order of Air Force Merit)
Real y Militar Orden de San Hermenegildo (Royal & Military Order of Saint Hermenegildo)
Cruz a la Constancia en el Servicio (Long Military Service Cross)
Medalla de Campaña (Campaign Medal)

Second Spanish Republic
Laureate Plate of Madrid
Madrid Distinction
Order of the Spanish Republic
Medal of the International Brigades
Medalla al Valor (Medal of Valor)
Medalla de la Libertad (Medal of Freedom)
Medalla de Sufrimientos por la Patria (Medal of the Suffering for the Fatherland)
Medalla de la Segunda Guerra de la Independencia (Medal of the Second War of Independence)
Reference: Segunda República (1931-1939)

Sri Lanka
Orders, decorations, and medals of Sri Lanka 
Military awards and decorations of Sri Lanka

Suriname
:Category:Orders, decorations, and medals of Suriname

Swaziland

Decorations
 Umbutfo Swaziland Defence Force Medal for Distinguished Service (1980–present)
 Umbutfo Swaziland Defence Force Medal for Meritorious Service (1980–present)
Long Service Medals
 Umbutfo Swaziland Defence Force Long Service Medal (1980–present)

Sweden
Orders, decorations, and medals of Sweden

Syria
:Category:Orders, decorations, and medals of Syria

Taiwan (Republic of China)
Orders, decorations, and medals of the Republic of China

Tanzania
Orders, decorations, and medals of Tanzania

Thailand
Orders, decorations, and medals of Thailand

Togo
:Category:Orders, decorations, and medals of Togo

Tonga
Orders, decorations, and medals of Tonga

Trinidad and Tobago

Tunisia
:Category:Orders, decorations, and medals of Tunisia

Turkey
Orders, decorations, and medals of Turkey

Turkmenistan
Orders, decorations, and medals of Turkmenistan

Tuscany
:Category:Orders, decorations, and medals of Tuscany

Two Sicilies
:Category:Orders, decorations, and medals of the Two Sicilies

Uganda
Orders, decorations, and medals of Uganda

Ukraine
Orders, decorations, and medals of Ukraine

United Arab Emirates
:Category:Orders, decorations, and medals of the United Arab Emirates

United Kingdom

Orders, decorations, and medals of the United Kingdom 
Military awards and decorations of the United Kingdom

United States
Awards and decorations of the United States military
Awards and decorations of the United States government

Uruguay
Orders, decorations, and medals of Uruguay

Vanuatu
:Category:Orders, decorations, and medals of Vanuatu

Venezuela
:Category:Orders, decorations, and medals of Venezuela

Vietnam
Vietnam awards and decorations

South Vietnam (former)
Orders, decorations, and medals of South Vietnam

Yugoslavia

Zambia
:Category:Orders, decorations, and medals of Zambia

Zanzibar
:Category:Orders, decorations, and medals of the Sultanate of Zanzibar

Zimbabwe
Orders, decorations, and medals of Zimbabwe

See also
 Lists of awards
 List of highest military decorations
 List of military awards and decorations of World War II
 List of military awards and decorations of the Gulf War
 List of wound decorations
List of international military decorations
United Nations Medal

External links
Medals of the World

military decorations